The tomb of Shimon bar Yochai, or Kever Rashbi, on Mount Meron is the traditional burial place of the 2nd century Mishnaic rabbi. A place of pilgrimage since the late 15th century, it is today the second most visited Jewish site in the world after the Western Wall with as many as two million annual visitors.

The tomb building was built in the mid-19th century by Shmuel Abu, the French consular agent in Safed.

History and structure

Jacob ben Netanel haKohen's 13th century travelogue is the first document to place Shimon bar Yochai and his son's tombs in Meron. Abraham ben Mordecai Galante (16th century) is said to have built a mausoleum over the tomb. According to historian Elhanan Reiner, the tomb was managed by Musta'arabi Jews even before the expulsion from Spain and establishment of the Spanish Jewish community in Israel in the 16th century.

At the beginning of the 19th century, the area was purchased by Shmuel Abu, the French consular agent in Safed who had immigrated from Algeria in 1817. Shmuel Abu built the tomb building which now stands on the site. The tomb building was described in the late 19th century PEF Survey of Palestine as "apparently a modern building." In 1956, Yosef Shenberger won a competition to renovate the building. 

The large tomb structure has recognizable light blue domes and includes several rooms. In the large room in the southern corner is a tombstone marking the tomb of Rabbi Shimon bar Yochai. In the center of the room is another tombstone marking the tomb of Rabbi Eleazar, the son of Rabbi Shimon bar Yochai.

Ownership
Ownership of the site is contested between rival Sephardic and Ashkenazic trusts, both of whom claim full ownership of the entire area citing hundreds of years’ precedent. Appeals to the courts have failed to settle the issue and the feud has allowed very little development to take place resulting in substandard facilities and safety concerns, the structure surrounding the tomb having become old and neglected. Millions of dollars in funding for redevelopment and refurbishment of the location were bequeathed by philanthropist Edmond Safra, but the quarreling between the parties is holding up release of the funds. An attempt by the state to take control over the site in 2011 to address health and safety concerns was met with anger by the private endowments operating the site and a court approved settlement in 2020 ruled that control would remain with the owners.

Annual pilgrimage

According to a modern Kabbalistic tradition, a pilgrimage is made to the tomb on Lag baOmer to mark either Rabbi Shimon bar Yochai's "Yom Hillula" or the anniversary of his death. The highlight of the event is the lighting of a bonfire at night on the roof of the tomb, after which joyous dancing begins. Various government bodies invest considerable sums of money and manpower resources to maintaining order and ensure the flow of traffic to the site.

In 1949, Rabbi Moshe-Zvi Neria organized a mass pilgrimage to the tomb following the Israeli victory in the 1948 Arab–Israeli War. This became the basis for an annual pilgrimage on 7 Adar, in addition to Lag BaOmer.

Bonfires
At the tomb of Rabbi Shimon, the honour of lighting the main bonfire traditionally goes to the Rebbes of the Boyaner dynasty. This privilege was purchased by Rabbi Avrohom Yaakov Friedman, the first Sadigura Rebbe, from the Sephardi guardians of Meron and Safed. The Sadigura Rebbe bequeathed this honor to his eldest son, Rabbi Yitzchok Friedman, the first Boyaner Rebbe, and his progeny. The first hadlakah (lighting) is attended by hundreds of thousands of people annually; in 2001, the crowd was estimated at 300,000.

First haircut for boys

	
A custom dating from the time of Rabbi Isaac Luria holds that boys be given their first haircuts on Lag baOmer, and today this generally means the Lag baOmer after their third birthday. Today a large event for this purpose is held at Meron, and similar celebrations are simultaneously held in Jerusalem at the grave of Shimon Hatzaddik for Jerusalemites.

Chai rotel liquid refreshment gift

Another custom at the tomb of Rabbi Shimon bar Yochai is the giving of Ḥai Rotel. The Hebrew letters chet and yod are the gematria (numerical equivalent) of 18. Rotel is a liquid measure of about 3 litres. Thus, 18 rotels equals 54 litres or about 13 gallons. It is popularly believed that if one donates or offers 18 rotels of liquid refreshment (grape juice, wine, soda or even water) to those attending the celebrations at bar Yochai's tomb on Lag BaOmer, then the giver will be granted miraculous salvation.
 
According to Taamei Minhagim, many childless couples found success with this segula (propitious practice). This practice was also endorsed by Rabbi Ovadia miBartenura and The Shelah HaKadosh. The Bobover Rav, Ben Zion Halberstam sent a letter from Poland to his Chassidim in Israel asking them to donate chai rotel in Meron on this holy day on behalf of a couple that did not have children. Several local organizations solicit donations of chai rotel and hand out the drinks on the donor's behalf in Meron on Lag BaOmer. Nine months after Lag BaOmer, the Ohel Rashbi organization even invites couples who prayed at the tomb and had a child to come back to Meron to celebrate the births.

Incidents

1911 collapse
On 15 May 1911, eleven people were killed when a crowd of about 10,000 filled the compound and a railing of a nearby balcony collapsed. About 100 people fell from a height of roughly seven meters to the ground below, the deaths of seven were determined at the scene and of four others in the days following the incident. There were 40 injured.

2021 stampede

On 30 April 2021, at about 00:50 IDT, a deadly crowd crush occurred in Meron during the annual pilgrimage to Mount Meron on the Jewish holiday of Lag BaOmer, at which about 100,000 people were in attendance. Forty-five people were killed, and more than 150 injured, dozens of them critically, making it the deadliest civil disaster in the history of Israel.

Gallery

See also
 Lag BaOmer
 2021 Meron crowd rush

References

Galilee
Jewish pilgrimage sites
Jews and Judaism in the Roman Empire
Lag BaOmer
Tombs in Israel